Enyel De Los Santos Polanco (born December 25, 1995) is a Dominican professional baseball pitcher for the Cleveland Guardians of Major League Baseball (MLB). The Seattle Mariners signed him as an international free agent on in 2014. He made his MLB debut in 2018. He previously played in MLB for the Philadelphia Phillies and the Pittsburgh Pirates.

Early life
De Los Santos was born in San Pedro de Macoris, in the Dominican Republic. He attended Liceo Gastón Fernández de Lino.

Career

Seattle Mariners
The Seattle Mariners signed him as an international free agent on July 17, 2014. De Los Santos made his professional debut in 2015, and spent the season with both the AZL Mariners and the Everett AquaSox, posting a combined 6–0 record and 3.47 ERA with 71 strikeouts in 62.1 innings between both teams.

San Diego Padres
After the 2015 season, the Mariners traded him and Nelson Ward to the San Diego Padres for Joaquín Benoit.

The Padres assigned him to the Class A Fort Wayne TinCaps to begin the 2016 season. After pitching to a 3–2 record and 2.91 ERA in 11 games (seven starts), he was promoted to the Class A-Advanced Lake Elsinore Storm, where he finished the season, going 5–3 with a 4.35 ERA in 15 games started, and was a Midwest League All Star.

In 2017, he pitched for the San Antonio Missions of the Class AA Texas League, where he went 10–6 with a 3.78 ERA (8th in the league) and a 1.19 WHIP (5th) in 26 games (24 starts), with 138 strikeouts (3rd in the league) in 150 innings. He was the Texas League Pitcher of the Week on both April 16 and August 13.

Philadelphia Phillies

On December 15, 2017, the Padres traded De Los Santos to the Philadelphia Phillies in exchange for Freddy Galvis. He began the 2018 season with the Lehigh Valley IronPigs of the Class AAA International League. He was the Phillies Minor League Co-Pitcher of the Month for April. De Los Santos was selected to represent the Phillies at the 2018 All-Star Futures Game. He was also elected to the AAA All Star Game. With Lehigh Valley in 2018 he was 10–5 with a 2.63 ERA (2nd in the International League), with 110 strikeouts in 126.2 innings, a WHIP of 1.16 (2nd), and an opponents batting average of .226 (3rd).

The Phillies promoted De Los Santos to the major leagues on July 10, 2018. He made his debut the same day, earning the win after allowing three runs and striking out 6 batters over 6 innings in a spot start against the New York Mets, and was optioned back to the IronPigs after the game. Coincidentally, the starting pitcher for the Mets in that game was Drew Gagnon, who was also making his Major League debut. In 2018 with the Phillies, he was 1–0 with a 4.74 ERA with 15 strikeouts in 19 innings.

In 2019 with Lehigh Valley he was 5–7 with a 4.40 ERA in 94.2 innings over 19 starts. In 2019 with the Phillies he was 0–1 with a 7.36 ERA in 11 innings over five games (one start). De Los Santos was designated for assignment on August 9, 2020. On August 15, he was outrighted to Triple-A.

On May 4, 2021, De Los Santos was selected to the active roster.
On July 20, 2021, he gave up Estevan Florial's first career home run. De Los Santos tossed 28 innings for the Phillies, posting a 6.75 ERA. On September 12, 2021, the Phillies designated De Los Santos for assignment.

Pittsburgh Pirates
A day after De Los Santos was designated for assigned by the Phillies he was claimed off waivers by the Pittsburgh Pirates.
On November 5, 2021, the Pirates outrighted De Los Santos to Triple-A Indianapolis, removing him from their 40-man roster. De Los Santos refused the minor league assignment and elected free agency on November 7, 2021.

Cleveland Guardians
On December 1, 2021, De Los Santos signed a minor league contract with an invitation to spring training with the Cleveland Guardians.
He did not make the Opening Day roster. After beginning the 2022 season with the Triple-A Columbus Clippers, the Guardians selected De Los Santos' contract as a COVID-19 replacement player on April 20, 2022. De Los Santos was returned to the minor leagues on May 8, 2022. The Guardians selected De Los Santos' contract once more on May 9, 2022. On September 27, 2022, De Los Santos pitched an immaculate inning against the Tampa Bay Rays.

In 2022 he was 5–0 with a 3.04 ERA in 53.1 innings, with a 1.069 WHIP.

References

External links

Living people
1995 births
Sportspeople from San Pedro de Macorís
Major League Baseball players from the Dominican Republic
Major League Baseball pitchers
Philadelphia Phillies players
Pittsburgh Pirates players
Cleveland Guardians players
Arizona League Mariners players
Everett AquaSox players
Fort Wayne TinCaps players
Lake Elsinore Storm players
San Antonio Missions players
Lehigh Valley IronPigs players
Tigres del Licey players
Columbus Clippers players